Margaret Joy Gelling,   (née Midgley; 29 November 1924 – 24 April 2009) was an English toponymist, known for her extensive studies of English place-names. She served as President of the English Place-Name Society from 1986 to 1998, and Vice-President of the International Council of Onomastic Sciences from 1993 to 1999, as well as being a Fellow of St Hilda's College, Oxford, She was an elected fellow of both the Society of Antiquaries of London and the British Academy.

Born in Manchester and raised in Kent, she studied at St Hilda's College, becoming involved in socialist activism. She proceeded to work for the English Place-Name Society from 1946 to 1953, focusing her research on the place-names of Oxfordshire and Berkshire. Marrying archaeologist Peter Gelling of the University of Birmingham in 1952, she moved to Harborne in Birmingham while undertaking her PhD research into the place-names of West Berkshire. Lecturing on the subject across the Midlands, she published her research in a series of books, achieving prominence within academia for her 1978 work Signposts to the Past: The Geographical Roots of Britain's Place-names. In the coming decades she focused on researching the place-names of Shropshire, resulting in a multi-volume publication, earning a number of awards and prominent appointments for her life's work.

Gelling's work focused on establishing the Old English origins of English place-names in the Midlands, and her approach sought to connect toponyms to geographical features in the landscape.

Biography

Early life: 1924–1951
Margaret Joy Midgley was born to a lower-middle-class family in Manchester on 29 November 1924, the daughter of an insurance salesman. As a child, her family moved to Sidcup in Kent, and she gained her secondary education from Chislehurst Grammar School. The first member of her family to attend university, she studied English language and literature at St Hilda's College, Oxford, where she was influenced by Dorothy Whitelock, who inspired her interest in place-names. Graduating in 1945, she later related that the experience at Oxford had been a "waste of time", believing English literature to be "dreadfully boring". Politically a socialist, at Oxford she had joined the Communist Party of Great Britain, and enjoyed arguing politics with her right-wing family.

Working for a year as a temporary civil servant in London, in 1946 she gained employment as a research assistant with the English Place-Name Society, based in Cambridge. She continued to work here for eight years, focusing her research on expanding and collating the place-names of Oxfordshire and Berkshire, a project that had been started before her by Frank Merry Stenton and his wife Lady Doris Stenton; her work in this field would see publication as the two volume The Place-Names of Oxfordshire (1953–54). She felt that her approach differed from Stenton's on political grounds; she believed most place-names had been developed by ordinary working people, whereas she thought that he "empathised with the ruling classes."

Success: 1952–2009
In 1952 she married the Manx archaeologist Peter Gelling, who soon obtained a teaching job at the University of Birmingham. For this reason, the couple moved to Harborne where she remained for the rest of her life. There, she would spend much time gardening, and although had no children of her own, raised her nephew, Adrian Midgley, from the age of six. She would undertake research for a PhD from the University of London by correspondence, supervised by Albert Hugh Smith; devoted to the place-names of West Berkshire, her thesis was completed in 1957. Having left the Communist Party, she still considered herself "very left-wing", campaigning on behalf of the local branch of the centre-left Labour Party.

She accompanied her husband on his archaeological excavations to various sites, both domestically and abroad. In the 1960s, she accompanied him to Alto Plano in Peru to study the development of potato cultivation, where she gained experience in cooking at high altitude. In the early 1970s, she travelled with him to Cyprus, where she was sorting through finds in the castle at Kyrenia when the Turkish army invaded in July 1974. For a number of seasons she managed morale and catering at the excavation camp at Deerness, Orkney, which her husband used as a training dig for his students.

During the 1960s, she published a series of innovative books on English place-names, also lecturing on the subject across the English Midlands under the aegis of the University of Birmingham's Department of Extra-Mural Studies.
She also lectured at Birmingham University on occasion, as well as running a summer school at Oxford. She went on to publish her three volumes of The Place-Names of Berkshire (1973, 1974 and 1976), which she followed with Signposts to the Past: Place-Names and the History of England (1978), a book which "put her in an elevated position among English toponymists" and which saw revised editions in 1987 and 1997.

Peter Gelling died in 1983, while Margaret took on the presidency of the English Place-Name Society from 1986 to 1998, and then the Vice-Presidency of the International Council for Onomastic Sciences from 1993 to 1999. Becoming a fellow of St Hilda's College in 1993, she was awarded an Order of the British Empire (OBE) in 1995, and in 1998, she was elected a Fellow of the British Academy, a rare feat for an individual who had never held an academic position. She continued lecturing widely until developing the illness from which she died.

Publications

Books

Articles

Notes

External links

1924 births
2009 deaths
Alumni of University College London
English communists
English non-fiction writers
English socialists
Fellows of the British Academy
Fellows of St Hilda's College, Oxford
Fellows of the Society of Antiquaries of London
Officers of the Order of the British Empire
Toponymists
Anglo-Saxon studies scholars